The Monahans Trojans were a minor league baseball team based in Monahans, Texas for one season. In 1937, the Trojans played as charter members of the Class D level West Texas-New Mexico League, qualifying for the league playoffs. Monahans hosted minor league home games at Allen Park.

History
Minor league baseball began in Monahans, Texas in 1937. The "Trojans" became charter members of the six–team, Class D level West Texas-New Mexico League. The Hobbs Drillers, Midland Cardinals, Odessa Oilers, Roswell Sunshiners and Wink Spudders joined Monahans in beginning league play on May 4, 1937.

In their only season of play, Monahans qualified for the West Texas-New Mexico League playoffs. The Trojans ended the regular season in third place with a record of 55–64, after two other league teams folded during the season. Playing the season under managers Paul Trammell and Charles Bryan, Monahans finished 13.5 games ahead the first place Wink Spudders. The final overall regular season standings were led Wink, followed by the Roswell Sunshiners (55–62), Monahans (55–64) and Hobbs Drillers (45–74). The Odessa Oilers (28–17) and Midland Cardinals (41–25) franchises both folded before the end of the season. In the first round of the playoffs, the Roswell Sunshiners defeated the Monahans Trojans three games to two in the final games for the Monahans franchise.

In 1938, The six–team West Texas-New Mexico League continued play without the Monahans franchise. Roswell was also folded as Midland reformed in 1938. Midland joined Hobbs and Wink in continuing West Texas-New Mexico League play with three new teams, as the Big Spring Barons, Clovis Pioneers and Lubbock Hubbers teams joined the league.

Monahans, Texas has not hosted another minor league team.

The ballpark
The Monahans Trojans teams hosted minor league home games at Allen Park. The ballpark had unique dimensions of (Left, Center, Right): 600-480-390. the Allen Park ballpark was located at East C Street & Harry Avenue. Allen Park is still in use today as a public park, located as 200 South Harry Avenue.

Year–by–year record

Notable alumni
Jess Pike (1937)

See also
Monahans Trojans players

References

External links
Monahan - Baseball Reference

Defunct minor league baseball teams
Defunct baseball teams in Texas
Baseball teams established in 1937
Baseball teams disestablished in 1937
1937 establishments in Texas
1937 disestablishments in Texas
Ward County, Texas
Winkler County, Texas